Konstantinos Nikolopoulos (1890 – 1980) was a Greek fencer. He competed at the 1924 and 1928 Summer Olympics. He was also the mayor of Athens in the early 1950s.

References

External links
 

1890 births
1980 deaths
Greek male fencers
Olympic fencers of Greece
Fencers at the 1924 Summer Olympics
Fencers at the 1928 Summer Olympics
Sportspeople from Athens